The  is a Japanese DC electric multiple unit (EMU) commuter train type operated by Tokyo Metro on the Yūrakuchō Line and Fukutoshin Line to replace the ageing Tokyo Metro 7000 series. It entered service on 21 February 2021.

Operations
17000 series trainsets operate on the following lines.

Formation
The fleet consists of six ten-car sets and 15 eight-car sets.

10-car sets 
10-car sets are formed as follows:

8-car sets 
Eight-car sets are formed as follows:

Key 
 <: Current collection device (single-arm pantograph)
 VVVF: Variable frequency drive
 SIV: Static inverter
 CP: Compressor
 BT: Battery
○: Unpowered axle
●: Powered axle

Interior
Passenger accommodation consists of longitudinal bench seating throughout. Priority seating is provided at the ends of each car. LCD passenger information screens are situated above each doorway.

The floor height is  lower than the floor height of the 7000 series.

History

In November 2019, Tokyo Metro announced plans to introduce a new fleet of 180 vehicles for the Yūrakuchō and Fukutoshin lines, which would replace the Tokyo Metro 7000 series.

The first trainset was delivered in January 2020.

On 26 May 2022, the 17000 series, alongside the similar 18000 series, was awarded the Laurel Prize.

Build histories
The manufacturers and delivery dates for the fleet are as shown below.

References

External links

Tokyo Metro official website 

Electric multiple units of Japan
17000 series
Train-related introductions in 2021
1500 V DC multiple units of Japan
Hitachi multiple units
Kinki Sharyo multiple units